Thomas Kakuska (born Vienna; August 25, 1940 – July 4, 2005) was an Austrian viola player, best known as the violist of the Alban Berg Quartett from 1981 until his death in Vienna in 2005.

Kakuska was a professor at the University of Music and Performing Arts, Vienna from 1971, and a visiting professor at the University of Cologne in Germany from 1993.

Following his death, Kakuska's close friend, the composer Hilda Paredes, wrote In Memoriam Thomas Kakuska for solo violin, which was given its premiere performance by her husband, Irvine Arditti, at a memorial concert in Vienna in 2006.

References

1940 births
2005 deaths
Austrian classical violists
Musicians from Vienna
20th-century classical musicians
20th-century violists